Mario Castellazzi (9 November 1935 – 1 October 2018) was an Italian professional footballer.

He played for 3 seasons (57 games, 8 goals) in the Serie A for A.S. Roma and Calcio Catania.

1935 births
2018 deaths
Italian footballers
Serie A players
U.S. Sassuolo Calcio players
U.S. Cremonese players
Spezia Calcio players
A.S. Roma players
Catania S.S.D. players
U.S. Livorno 1915 players
U.S. Pistoiese 1921 players
Association football midfielders
People from Finale Emilia